Clenell may refer to:

 Clennell, Northumberland, England
 Clennell (surname) an English surname
 Clennell Wickham (1895-1938), West Indian journalist